A resident magistrate is a title for magistrates used in certain parts of the world, that were, or are, governed by the British. Sometimes abbreviated as RM, it refers to suitably qualified personnel—notably well versed in the law—brought into an area from outside as the local magistrate, typically to be the guiding hand amongst other lay magistrates.

In colonial history, resident magistrates have had gubernatorial functions in a few minor, isolated colonial settlements, such as:
Ascension, as dependency of Saint Helena; post filled by managers of Eastern Telegraph/Cable and Wireless since 1922 (previously under a commanding officer), replaced since June 1964 by an Administrator
Walvisbaai, only two incumbents shortly after the 12 March 1878 annexed by Britain as Walvis Bay protectorate, first under a captain; annexation confirmed 14 December 1878:
1 June 1878 – November 1880 D. Erskine
November 1880 – 7 August 1884 Benjamin Musgrave, staying on as Magistrate

Resident magistrates' courts remain in operation as one of the divisions of the judiciary of Jamaica, hearing civil and criminal cases in each parish of the island.

In Ireland

In pre-independence Ireland, a Resident Magistrate was a stipendary magistrate appointed to a county (outside of the Dublin Metropolitan Police District) to sit among the justices of the peace at Petty Sessions in that county. They were appointed by the Lord Lieutenant of Ireland (in reality, therefore, by the Dublin Castle administration in Ireland).

Role
The role of resident magistrate was created on a somewhat trial basis in 1814, and extended to the entire country by the Constabulary (Ireland) Act 1836. The resident magistrate was supposed to sit amongst the justices at Petty Sessions—the courts of summary jurisdiction in pre-independence Ireland—and guide the justices to apply the law impartially. In reality they came to preside at Petty Sessions, and even sit alone without justices. RMs did not need to be legally trained in pre-independence Ireland, and many were ex-British Army officers. The "Resident" referred to the requirement that the magistrate live in the county to which he was assigned.

The role was often criticised as being under the influence of the Dublin Castle administration, and Irish politicians often cited the "RM" as really standing for "Removable Magistrate", since they held office at the Lord Lieutenant's pleasure and could be removed.

In some parts of western counties in the later 1800s at the time of the Famine, and then the Land War, it became hard to find enough suitably-educated local magistrates, and so an RM could be sent to help them. He was salaried and they were volunteers.

After Irish independence

The office of RM was unique in the United Kingdom to Ireland, and in the 20th century, led to the modern position in both Northern Ireland and the Republic of Ireland whereby courts of summary jurisdiction (the District Court in the Republic and Magistrates' Courts in Northern Ireland), are composed of legally qualified district judges sitting alone. This is in sharp contrast to England and Wales where magistrates courts mainly consist of benches of three lay justices and there are only a minority of paid district judges (magistrates' courts). In Scotland Justice of the Peace Courts are also primarily staffed by lay magistrates.

Republic of Ireland
In the part of Ireland that was to become the Irish Free State, Petty Sessions could not be held for many years due to the Irish War of Independence, restricting the role of the RMs. On 23 August 1922, the Provisional Government of Ireland placed all of the RMs on leave, and at the end of September 1922 it terminated all commissions of the peace, effectively dismissing all the RMs and justices of the peace. This was not quite the end of the office of Resident Magistrate, as it then proceeded to appoint 27 solicitors and barristers to the post. Although appointed to the position of Resident Magistrate, the Provisional Government only publicly described these individuals as District Justices, and brought in legislation in 1923 (the District Justices (Temporary Provisions) Act 1923) to officially change the name of the position. The Courts of Justice Act 1924 finally abolished the office and transferred its jurisdiction to the District Court of Justice. The Justices of the District Court continued to be popularly called District Justices until the position was renamed Judge of the District Court (or District Judge) in 1991.

Northern Ireland
The position continued as before in Northern Ireland until 1935, when the Summary Jurisdiction and Criminal Justice Act (Northern Ireland) was passed. From then on Resident Magistrates had to be legally qualified solicitors or barristers in Northern Ireland of at least six years' standing. Petty Sessions (which later became known as Magistrates' Courts) would henceforth consist solely of a resident magistrate sitting alone. Since the passing of the Justice (Northern Ireland) Act 2002, two lay magistrates sit with the district judge in Youth Court (criminal proceedings involving children) and Family Proceedings Court (family law) matters, but the judge still sits alone in other matters. Where lay magistrates sit with the judge, the judge presides and guides the lay magistrates in the law. The position was renamed District Judge (Magistrates Court) in 2008.

In popular culture

The book Some Experiences of an Irish RM by Edith Somerville and Violet Florence Martin, published in 1899 focused on a fictional Irish RM, Major Yeates. Two sequels were written and a TV programme, The Irish R.M., produced by RTÉ and UTV, which ran between 1983 and 1985.

Deputy magistrate
When the Caprivi Strip (formerly German Barotse- or Zambezi-land, in present Namibia) which had been administered by British Military Administrators since 21 September 1914 formally came under the administration of the British high commissioners for Southern Africa, the last Military Administrator stayed on as the first of only two Deputy magistrates, the highest British colonial official actually resident in the Strip:

 1 January 1921 – c.1924 H. Neale
 1940 – 1951 Lyall French Trollope

Sources and references

External links
WorldStatesmen- see each present country

Gubernatorial titles
Governance of the British Empire
Region-specific legal occupations